On 4 September 2016, a car containing seven canisters of gas and pages with Arabic writing was found parked near Notre-Dame de Paris cathedral in Paris.

Attempt
The car that was meant to be detonated was a grey Peugeot 607 with its license plates removed. It was packed with several gas canisters full of diesel fuel, some of which was used to douse the inside of the car. A lit cigarette was used in an attempt to initiate the explosion, however the fuel did not ignite and the perpetrators left the scene.

Arrests
"Information we were able to get from our intelligence services allowed us to act before it was too late," said President François Hollande. Inès Madani, accused of leading the bomb attempt, posed as a man under the name "Abu Omar" on social media to recruit jihadis to join her in attacking Notre Dame, and successfully recruited Ornella Gilligmann, a mother of three. According to Gilligmann, she then stopped hearing from "Abu Omar", but was contacted by Madani.

Police also arrested Amel Sakaou, 39, and Sarah Hervouët, 23. All three women were armed with knives. During the arrest, Hervouët, who was "completely veiled", stabbed a policeman. Hervouët converted to Islam a few months before traveling towards Syria in 2015, and was betrothed to Adel Kermiche, one of the terrorists of the Normandy church attack. One of the arrested women was alleged to have had a letter professing allegiance to the Islamic State. Two men said to be connected with ISIL propagandist Rachid Kassim were also arrested in connection with the plot.

Trial 
The trial of five accused women commenced in Paris, in September 2019. The accused women were Inès Madani, Ornella Gilligmann, Sarah Hervouët, Amel Sakaou and Samia Chalel, between the ages 22 and 42 all converts to Islam. On 15 October 2019, Madani was given a 30-year prison sentence, Gilligmann a 25-year prison sentence, Hervouët and Sakaou were given 20 years each, while Chalel received five years for helping Madani hide after the failed attack. The Frenchman Rachid Kassim, thought to have been killed in Iraq in 2017, was sentenced to life in absentia.

See also
 Islamist plots to attack the Vatican
 Strasbourg Cathedral bombing plot
 2017 St. Petersburg raid
 2016 Normandy church attack

References 

 

2016 in Christianity
2016 in Paris
2010s crimes in Paris
2010s trials
Failed terrorist attempts in France
Islamic terrorism in Paris
Islamic terrorist incidents in 2016
Bombing attempt
September 2016 crimes in Europe
September 2016 events in France
Terrorist incidents in France in 2016
Trials in France